Pol Heyvaert is a Belgian stage director and designer with long-standing ties to the Ghent-based theatre company Victoria.

Pol Heyvaert has a long-standing relationship with
Victoria. He was the stage designer for several of
their productions including: Moeder en Kind ([[Alain
Platel]] & Arne Sierens; 1994); Bernadetje (Alain Platel
& Arne Sierens; 1997); Dansé Donsé Dan Dan (Latrinité;
1995), Auri Sacra Fames (Latrinité; 1997); Limbus
Patrum (Latrinité; 2000), Wayn Storm Carmen Story and
Mise-en-Traub V (Wayn Traub;2001); Snack Bar Tragedy
(Christophe Frick; 2002) and White Star (Lies Pauwels;
2004).

Pol Heyvaert also founded the Kung Fu collective together with Felix van Groeningen, where he directed Best Of and Discothèque.
He has also worked as stage designer for les ballets C de la B, notably for Alain Platel's iets Op Bach (1998), and for Nieuwpoorttheater with De 10des (1994), Napels (1996), Radio Carmen (1996) and Flippers (1996).

In 2001, he collaborated with Felix van Groeningen again on the Kung Fu short film Bonjour Maman and as a production designer for the feature film Steve + Sky.

Supporting artist For Oh Boy. In 2006

Artistic director in looking for Alfred from [Johan Grimonprez] 2005.

Directed Aalst (play) Conceived, directed and designed texts by Pol Heyvaert and Dimitri Verhulst
English translation by Duncan McLean
National Theatre of Scotland production
Original version Victoria 2005
Scottish version 2007, production at the Sydney Festival 2008

Directed, stage design and video  Nightshade

A Victoria production,.

directed, wrote René. (co-text Paul Mennens)

A Campo production
Coproductie: Theater Antigone & MUHKA
TO BREAK-THE WINDOW OF OPPORTUNITY
Robbert&Frank/Frank&Robbert
THIRD EYE, COACHING 
2014

Artistic team arts centre CAMPO
1212

chocolate- Шоколаде (DANCE)
Directed
2011

DIALOGUE DANCE Kostroma Russia 
Sasha Frolov en Anna Sheklein

Girl X, Glasgow Scotland 
National Theatre of Scotland
Winter 2010- 2011

FML Cork, Cork Ireland.
Conceived, directed, text.
Cork midsummer festival
Summer 2010

Out Of Order, Cork Ireland. 
Conceived, directed
Workshop Campo/ Cork Midsummer Festival.
2009

Part of the Weekend Never Dies
Soulwax . camera.
2008

René: Conceived, directed, text (co Paul Mennens) 
Designer Theatre exhibition October Koen Van den Broek
2008
Campo Co production Muhka.

Aalst remake Scotland.
Conceived, directed and designer.
Theater 2007 National Theatre of Scotland.

Nachtschade / Nightshade / Belladonne / Nachtschatten
general direction, video & setdesign.
Theater 2006 Victoria

Oh Boy /supporting artist/ Scenografie
Dance, 2006 Victoria.

Aalst Conceived, directed, texst (co Dimitri Verhulst)  and designer
Theater 2005 Victoria

Looking for Alfred : Castings (B)
Film, 2005, Johan Grimonprez 
 
White Star: Scenografie  	
Theater, 2004, Victoria

Cutuurprijzen 2004 Directed / Scenografie / Concept
Evenement 2004 Vlaamse Gemeenschap

Le Salon: Scenografie
Theater, 2004, Peeping Tom

Steve+Sky: Art Director
Film, 2004, Menuet

The Making Of: Director (co. Lies Pauwels)
Video, 2004, Kulturhuset Stockholm

Wayn Wash I: Maria Dolores : Scenografie
Theater, 2004, Wayn Traub

Bonjour Maman: Directed  (co. Felix van Groeningen)
Kortfilm, 2002, Kung Fu

Moeder en Kind (Remake) : Scenografie
Theater, 2002, Kompas / Victoria

Snack Bar Tragedy : Scenografie
Theater, 2002, Victoria

Kung Fu - Discothèque : Regie
Theater, 2001, Kung Fu

The Ride : Regie
Evenement /  Brugge 2002 Culturele Hoofdstad

Le Jardin : Scenografie 
Theater, 2001, Peeping Tom

Kung Fu -Best Of : Regie
Theater, 2000, Victoria / Kung Fu

Limbus Patrum : Scenografie
Theater, 2000, Victoria / Latrinité

Wayn Storm : Scenografie
Theater, 1999, Wayn Traub / Victoria

Iets op Bach : Scenografie
Theater/Dans, 1998, Les Ballets C de la B
A. Platel.

Bernadetje : Scenografie
Theater, 1997, Victoria Platel/Sierens

Napels : Scenografie
Theater, 1996, Arne Sierens / Johan Dehollander

Moeder en Kind : Scenografie 
Theater, 1994, Platel/Sierens

References

Living people
Belgian theatre directors
Year of birth missing (living people)